Creeton is a hamlet in the civil parish of Counthorpe and Creeton in the  South Kesteven district of Lincolnshire, England.

Creeton Grade I listed Anglican parish church is dedicated to St Peter. It is of late Decorated style. During restoration in 1851 the piers and arches of a former Norman aisle were discovered. The church holds a chained 1611 bible. In the churchyard are two examples of Saxon grave crosses, and 20 stone coffins considered to mark the interment of Cistercian monks of Vallis Dei abbey in the neighbouring Edenham parish.

There are no amenities in Creeton; the nearest school is in Little Bytham, with shops in Corby Glen, Little Bytham and Castle Bytham, and public house in Swinstead. The hamlet consists of approximately 20 households.

References

External links

Hamlets in Lincolnshire
South Kesteven District